Amrita (IAST: amṛta), Amrit or Amata in Pali, (also called Sudha, Amiy, Ami) is a Sanskrit word that means "immortality". It is a central concept within Indian religions and is often referred to in ancient Indian texts as an elixir. Its first occurrence is in the Rigveda, where it is considered one of several synonyms for soma, the drink of the devas. Amrita plays a significant role in the Samudra Manthana, and is the cause of the conflict between devas and asuras competing for amrita to obtain immortality.

Amrita has varying significance in different Indian religions. The word Amrit is also a common first name for Sikhs and Hindus, while its feminine form is Amritā. Amrita is cognate to and shares many similarities with ambrosia; both originated from a common Proto-Indo-European source.

Etymology 
Amrita is composed of the negative prefix, अ  from Sanskrit meaning 'not', and  meaning 'death' in Sanskrit, thus meaning 'not death' or 'immortal/deathless'.

The concept of an immortality drink is attested in at least two ancient Indo-European languages: Ancient Greek and Sanskrit. The Greek ἀμβροσία (ambrosia) is semantically linked to the Sanskrit  (amṛta) as both words denote a drink or food that gods use to achieve immortality. The two words appear to be derived from the same Indo-European form *ṇ-mṛ-tós, "un-dying" (n-: negative prefix from which the prefix a- in both Greek and Sanskrit are derived; mṛ: zero grade of *mer-, "to die"; and -to-: adjectival suffix). A semantically similar etymology exists for Greek nectar, the beverage of the gods (Greek: νέκταρ néktar) presumed to be a compound of the PIE roots *nek-, "death", and -*tar, "overcoming".

Hinduism 

Amrita is repeatedly referred to as the drink of the devas, which grants them immortality. Despite this, the nectar does not actually offer true immortality. Instead, by partaking it, the devas were able to attain a higher level of knowledge and power, which they had lost due to the curse of the sage Durvasa, as described in the Samudra Manthana legend. It tells how the devas, after the curse, begin to lose their immortality. Assisted by their rivals, the asuras, the devas begin to churn the ocean, releasing, among other extraordinary objects and beings, a pitcher of amrita, held by the deity Dhanvantari.

Brahma enlightens the devas regarding the existence of this substance:

When the asuras claim the nectar for themselves, Vishnu assumes the form of the enchantress Mohini, and her beauty persuades the asuras to crudely offer her the task of its distribution:
When the danava Rahu disguised himself as a deva and sat in the clan's row to partake in consuming the nectar, Surya and Chandra alerted Mohini of his presence. Mohini sliced his head off with her Sudarshana Chakra, and continued to distribute the nectar to every single one of the devas, after which she assumed her true form of Narayana and defeated the asuras in a battle.

Sikhism 
In Sikhism, amrit is the name of the holy water used in Amrit Sanchar, a ceremony which resembles baptism. This ceremony is observed to initiate the Sikhs into the Khalsa and requires drinking amrit. This is created by mixing a number of soluble ingredients, including sugar, and is then rolled with a khanda with the accompaniment of scriptural recitation of five sacred verses.

Metaphorically, God's name is also referred to as a nectar:
ਅੰਮ੍ਰਿਤ ਸਬਦੁ ਅੰਮ੍ਰਿਤ ਹਰਿ ਬਾਣੀ ॥

The Shabda is Amrit; the Lord's bani is Amrit. 
 
ਸਤਿਗੁਰਿ ਸੇਵਿਐ ਰਿਦੈ ਸਮਾਣੀ ॥

Serving the True Guru, it permeates the heart. 
 
ਨਾਨਕ ਅੰਮ੍ਰਿਤ ਨਾਮੁ ਸਦਾ ਸੁਖਦਾਤਾ ਪੀ ਅੰਮ੍ਰਿਤੁ ਸਭ ਭੁਖ ਲਹਿ ਜਾਵਣਿਆ ॥

O Nanak, the Ambrosial Naam is forever the Giver of peace; drinking in this Amrit, all hunger is satisfied.

Buddhism 
Buddha is called as "Amata Santam" in Pali Literature.

Theravada Buddhism 
According to Thanissaro Bhikkhu, "the deathless" refers to the deathless dimension of the mind which is dwelled in permanently after nibbana.

In the Amata Sutta, the Buddha advises monks to stay with the four Satipatthana: "Monks, remain with your minds well-established in these four establishings of mindfulness. Don't let the deathless be lost to you."

In the questions for Nagasena, King Milinda asks for evidence that the Buddha once lived, wherein Nagasena describes evidence of the Dhamma in a simile:

Chinese Buddhism 
Chinese Buddhism describes Amrita as blessed water, food, or other consumable objects often produced through merits of chanting mantras.

Vajrayana Buddhism 

Amrita also plays a significant role in Vajrayana Buddhism as a sacramental drink which is consumed at the beginning of all important rituals such as the abhisheka, ganachakra, and homa. In the Tibetan tradition, dütsi is made during  – lengthy ceremonies involving many high lamas. It usually takes the form of small, dark-brown grains that are taken with water, or dissolved in very weak solutions of alcohol and is said to improve physical and spiritual well-being.

The foundational text of traditional Tibetan medicine, the Four Tantras, is also known by the name The Heart of Amrita.

The Immaculate Crystal Garland describes the origin of amrita in a version of the samudra manthana legend retold in Buddhist terms. In this Vajrayana version, the monster Rahu steals the amrita and is blasted by Vajrapani's thunderbolt. As Rahu has already drunk the amrita he cannot die, but his blood, dripping onto the surface of this earth, causes all kinds of medicinal plants to grow. At the behest of all the Buddhas, Vajrapani reassembles Rahu who eventually becomes a protector of Buddhism according to the Nyingma school of Tibetan Buddhism.

Inner Offering is the most symbolic amrita offering assembly, and the Inner Offering Nectar Pill is a precious and secret medicine of Tibetan Buddhism, which are only used internally for higher-ranking monks in Nyingma school. Its ingredients including Five Amrita and Five Meat, which represents five buddhas, and five elements respectively. According to Tantras of Chakravarti, and Tantras of Vajravārāhī, a ceremony needs to be held for melting and blessing the Inner-Offering Nectar. Five Nectar needs to be arranged in four directions: yellow excrement in the east, green bone marrow in the north, white semen in the west and red blood in the south; blue urine is placed in the center. Four Nectar should come from wise monks and the ova should be collected from the first menstruation of a blessed woman. The Five Meats are arranged similarly, meat of black bull in the southeast, the meat of the blue dog in the southwest, the meat of the white elephant in the northwest, the meat of the green horse in the northeast, and the meat of a red human corpse in the center. After the ceremony, these ingredients will transform into a one taste (ekarasa) elixir, which bestows bliss, vitality, immortality and wisdom. Actual modern practitioner will take a 'synthesized essence' of the Nectar Pill and combined it with black tea or alcohol, but mostly the "Nectar Pill" are derived from plants.

See also 

 Ameretat
 Ambrosia
 Elixir of Life
 Panchamrita
 Peaches of Immortality
 Potion
 Soma
 Traditional Tibetan medicine

References

Sources
Dallapiccola, Anna L. Dictionary of Hindu Lore and Legend.

External links

Ayurvedic Rasayana – Amrit
Immortal Boons of Amrit and Five Kakars
Depictions in stone at Angkor Wat and Angkor Thom (Cambodia) of how the gods dredged amrit from the bottom of the ocean 
https://web.archive.org/web/20110110035820/http://earthrites.org/magazine_article_crowley.htm 
https://web.archive.org/web/20110707061343/http://www.20kweb.com/etymology_dictionary_A/origin_of_the_word_ambrosia.htm

Buddhist mythology
Buddhism and medicine
Rigveda
Sikh practices
Mythological medicines and drugs
Mythological food and drink
Indian feminine given names
Immortality
Sanskrit words and phrases